The singles discography of American country artist, Tanya Tucker, contains 89 lead singles, six featured singles, two promotional singles, one additional charting song, 18 lead music videos and three featured music videos. Tucker's career was launched in 1972 when she was 13 years old. That year, her debut single called "Delta Dawn" was released. It went to number six on the America's Billboard Hot Country Songs chart and number 72 on the Hot 100. It was followed by three consecutive number one Billboard singles in 1973: "What's Your Mama's Name", "Blood Red and Goin' Down" and "Would You Lay with Me (In a Field of Stone)". 

In 1975, "Lizzie and the Rainman" reached charting positions in multiple fields, including topping the Billboard and RPM country charts. It also charted the top ten on both the Billboard and RPM adult contemporary charts. Both "San Antonio Stroll" and "Here's Some Love" topped the country charts through 1976. In 1978, Tucker reached the country top five with "Texas (When I Die)". Tucker's commercial success began to wane in the early eighties. While she had three top ten Billboard singles, most of her releases reached positions outside the top 40. 

In 1986, she returned with the top five with the single "One Love at a Time". It was followed by a string of American and Canadian top ten country singles. This included six chart topping songs: "Just Another Love", "I'll Come Back as Another Woman", "I Won't Take Less Than Your Love", "If It Don't Come Easy", "Strong Enough to Bend" and "Highway Robbery". As Tucker's career transitioned into the nineties, she continued having commercial success. While the majority of her singles did not top the charts, they reached the top ten. This included "Walking Shoes", "Down to My Last Teardrop" and "Two Sparrows in a Hurricane". Tucker reached the country songs top ten for the last time in 1997 with "Little Things". She started recording less beginning in the new millennium. Her most recent charting single was 2019's "Bring My Flowers Now".

As lead artist

1970s

1980s

1990s

2000s–2020s

As featured artist

Promotional singles

Other charted songs

Music videos

As lead artist

As featured artist

References

Notes

External links
 Tanya Tucker discography at Discogs

Discographies of American artists
Country music discographies